La Bastide-sur-l'Hers (literally La Bastide on the Hers) is a commune in the Ariège department in the Occitanie region of southwestern France.

The inhabitants of the commune are known as Bastidhersois or Bastidhersoises.

Geography
La Bastide-sur-l'Hers is located some 28 km south-east of Pamiers and 3 km north-east of Lavelanet. Access to the commune is by the D620 road from Laroque-d'Olmes in the north-west which goes east through the commune and the village and continues east to Le Peyrat. The D16 comes from L'Aiguillon in the south and passes north inside the eastern border of the commune to the village then continues north to join the D28A south of Léran. A former railway line now a walking trail passes through the commune from west to east just north of the village. The commune has two large belts of forest across the centre and south with most of the rest of the commune farmland.

The Hers river flows from the south forming the south-eastern border before passing through the village and continuing east to eventually join the Ariège at Cintegabelle. The Ruiseeau des Écrevisses forms the southern border of the commune as it flows east to join the Hers. The Ruisseau de Pépoulant also flows east across the commune a little further north and joins the Hers.

Toponymy
La Bastide-sur-l'Hers appears as la Baſtide de Cougoust on the 1750 Cassini Map and as la Bastide on the 1790 version.

Administration
List of Successive Mayors

Demography
In 2017 the commune had 678 inhabitants.

Sites and Monuments
The Church of Our Lady of the Assumption. The keystone indicates a date of 1527. An organ was installed there in 2008 following an anonymous bequest to the pastor of the parish, who also donated. This instrument, with two keyboards and pedals, was built by Krischer (Rouen) in 1893.
A Protestant church was built in 1826
A Covered Market from the late 19th century

There is a Monumental Painting (18th century) in a house which is registered as an historical object but its location is unclear.

Notable people linked to the commune
 Philippe Tissié was born in La Bastide-sur-l'Hers on 18 October 1852.
 Annie Campayo wife of SABY was born in la Bastide-sur-l'Hers on 3 February 1951.

See also
Communes of the Ariège department

References

External links

Official site

Communes of Ariège (department)